Knickerbocker Mansion is a historic home located at Schaghticoke in Rensselaer County, New York.

The property was occupied by the Knickerbocker family for nearly 250 years, from about 1707 until 1946. The mansion was built by Johannes Knickerbacker III around 1770. It was acquired in 1964 by the Knickerbocker Historical Society and is operated as a local history museum.  The Knickerbocker Historical Society (KHS) have almost entirely restored the mansion.

The Knickerbocker Mansion grounds were the location of the “Witenagemot Oak,” planted in 1676 to commemorate the signing of a treaty between New York governor Edmund Andros and the local Mahican people and native refugees from King Philip's War. The oak stood until 1948.

The house was built about 1770 and is a -story, rectangular brick building.  It has a hipped roof, covered in slate, that curves slightly at the eaves. The front facade once featured a one-bay, pedimented entrance portico.

It was listed on the National Register of Historic Places in 1972.

References

External links
Knickerbocker Mansion
The Knickerbocker Historical Society

Historic house museums in New York (state)
Houses on the National Register of Historic Places in New York (state)
Houses completed in 1770
Houses in Rensselaer County, New York
Museums in Rensselaer County, New York
National Register of Historic Places in Rensselaer County, New York
1770 establishments in the Province of New York